Nulla in mundo pax sincera, RV 630, is a sacred motet composed by Antonio Vivaldi in 1735 to an anonymous Latin text, the title of which may be translated as "In this world there is no honest peace" or "There is no true peace in this world without bitterness".  Written in the key of E major and in the typical lyrical Italian Baroque style, it is scored for solo soprano, two violins, viola and basso continuo, this would normally be a cello and keyboard instrument, in Vivaldi's case often the organ. The text dwells on the imperfections of a world full of evil and sin, and praises Jesus for the salvation he offers from it.  It is considered to be one of Vivaldi's most beautiful solo motets.

The motet consists of three parts (Aria; Recitative; Aria), followed by a concluding Alleluia. A full performance of the piece takes approximately 13 minutes.

Text

In popular culture
The first aria, sung by Jane Edwards, was featured in the 1996 film Shine.

Media

 The instrumental version of Nulla in mundo pax sincera is used as the song for the phonograph in the video game We Need to Go Deeper

External links

Performance of Nulla in mundo pax sincera by A Far Cry with Amanda Forsythe (soprano) from the Isabella Stewart Gardner Museum in M4A format

Compositions by Antonio Vivaldi
Motets